Killannur (CT) is a census town in Thrissur district in the state of Kerala, India.

It comprises all the wards in Mulakunnathukavu Grama Panchayat and a small number of wards from Madakkathara Grama Panchayat

Demographics
 India census, Killannur had a population of 18510 with 9102 males and 9408 females.

References

Villages in Thrissur district